Electric Avenue is a market street in Brixton, London, England.

Electric Avenue may also refer to:

Streets

Canada 
 Previous name of Red Mile in Calgary, Alberta

United Kingdom 

 A street in Westcliff-on Sea, Essex, England
 A street in Enfield, London, England
 A street in Witton, Birmingham, built by the General Electric Company as the location of its first purpose built works

United States 
 A street in Alhambra, California
 A street in Elverta, California
 A street in San Bernardino, California
 A street in Seal Beach, California
 A street in Venice, California
 A street near Berkeley station in Berkeley, Illinois
 A street in the Oak Square-Brighton neighborhood of Boston, Massachusetts
 A street in Fitchburg, Massachusetts, U.S.
 A street that runs between Leominster and Lunenburg, Massachusetts
 A street in Somerville, Massachusetts
 A street in Lincoln Park, Michigan
 A street (MI 94 S) in Port Huron, Michigan
 A street in Riverview, Michigan
 A street in Concord, New Hampshire
 A dirt road that runs through the former location of Contoocook River Amusement Park, Penacook, New Hampshire
 A street in Rochester, New Hampshire
 A street in Secaucus, New Jersey
 A street that runs between Blasdell and Lackawanna, New York
 A street in East Greenbush, New York
 A street in the Shelby Hills neighborhood of Nashville, Tennessee
 A street in the Dunn Loring neighborhood of Vienna, Virginia

Entertainment
 "Electric Avenue" (song), a 1982 song by Eddy Grant named after the street in Brixton
 Electric Avenue (TV series), a 1988 BBC series on the application of computers to everyday life
 A radio program hosted by Richard Z. Sirois in Quebec and Ontario, Canada
 Electric Avenue is a music festival held in Hagley Park, Christchurch, New Zealand
 A seafront arcade in Southend-on-Sea, Essex, England

Other uses
 Electric Avenue (Portland), a joint research and development initiative in Portland, Oregon
 Electric Avenue, the household electronics and appliances department of the now defunct Montgomery Ward department store chain
 Former name of Franklin Avenue (BMT Lexington Avenue Line), a railway station in New York City, New York, U.S.